is a Japanese manga series written and illustrated by Minoru Furuya. It was serialized in Kodansha's seinen manga magazine Weekly Young Magazine from January 2001 to March 2002, with its chapters collected in four tankōbon volumes. The manga was adapted into a live action film adaptation which was shown at the 68th Venice International Film Festival, held in Venice, Italy, in 2011, and premiered in Japan in January 2012.

Media

Manga
Written and illustrated by Minoru Furuya, Himizu was serialized in Kodansha's seinen manga magazine Weekly Young Magazine from January 29, 2001, to March 11, 2002. Kodansha collected its chapters in four tankōbon volumes, released from July 23, 2001, to August 5, 2005.

Volume list

Film

A live action film adaptation was shown at the 68th Venice International Film Festival, held from August 31 to September 10, 2011, in Venice, Italy, and premiered in Japan on January 14, 2012.

Stage play
A stage play adaptation ran at the Mixalive Tokyo's Theater Mixa, Tokyo, from September 18–26, 2021.

References

External links

Drama anime and manga
Kodansha manga
Psychological anime and manga
Seinen manga